Margaret Kennix (?-1585) was a Dutch empiric that practiced medicine in London.

Personal details 
Margaret Kennix was an unlicensed medical practitioner during the Elizabethan Era in London. She had her own medical practice from the years 1571–1585. Margaret was not native to London, and she was known as a Dutch empiric that practiced medicine. It is believed that she lived on the street Old Seacole Lane in London.

Career and difficulties 
Margaret Kennix dealt with issues regarding her authority to practice medicine in London. She particularly dealt with the Royal College of Physicians that had a strong presence in the city of London. The Royal College of Physicians was one of the main governing bodies of medicine. King Henry VII established it as a Royal Charter in 1518. The college attempted to put a complete stop to Margaret's medical practice.

Margaret Kennix turned to the royal family for help after the college had consistently attempted to shut down her practice entirely. Margaret knew that having someone in the royal family vouching for her was very beneficial. Queen Elizabeth I informed the college in 1581 of her support for Margaret Kennix. Sir Francis Walsingham informed the College of Queen Elizabeth's support for Margaret, and he listed two separate reasons as to why she should be allowed to practice medicine. The first reason was, "God has given her a special knowledge to the benefit of the poorer sort". He also informed the college that her family, "wholly depend on the exercise of her skill". This was due to Margaret's husband not being able to work. The college responded to this act of support with a resounding and stout answer. The writer for the college said that Margaret Kennix was an, "outlandish, ignorant, sorry woman". The college also suggested that allowing Margaret Kennix to practice medicine would set a harmful standard and would be breaking the "Holsome Lawes" that prevent medical practices foreign to the college. The college believed her "weakness and insufficiency" were enough to warrant such a response. The final decision of the college is unknown.

References

1585 deaths
16th-century Dutch physicians